Obwera was one of the six independent kingdoms in present-day Uganda which were established after the fall of the Kingdom of Mpororo in 1752. It was ruled by an Omukama. It became a part of the Kingdom of Ankole in 1901.

See also
Igara
Kajara
Nshenyi
Rujumbura
Rukiga

References
World Statesmen.org

Ankole